Wheatley Place is a neighborhood in South Dallas, Texas, that is designated as a historic district on the National Register of Historic Places (NRHP) and as a somewhat smaller Dallas Landmark District by the city. Included among the buildings that compose the historic district is the Juanita J. Craft Civil Rights House, a museum that was the former home of Dallas civil rights pioneer, Juanita Craft. The house is a Recorded Texas Historic Landmark and is included within the NRHP district but not the municipal landmark district.

Predominantly constructed as a neighborhood for African-Americans, the area was named for Phillis Wheatley, an African-American poet from the 18th century, who was the first African-American author of a published book of poetry.

The district was listed on the National Register on March 23, 1995, and the Dallas City Council designated Wheatley Place as a historic landmark district on October 25, 2000.

See also

National Register of Historic Places listings in Dallas County, Texas
Recorded Texas Historic Landmarks in Dallas County
List of Dallas Landmarks

References

External links

National Register of Historic Places in Dallas
Historic districts on the National Register of Historic Places in Texas
Dallas Landmarks
Houses in Dallas
African-American history of Texas